Baghu (also Romanized as Bāghū and Baghoo) is a village in Sarkhun Rural District, Qaleh Qazi District, Bandar Abbas County, Hormozgan Province, Iran. At the 2006 census, its population was 353, in 77 families.

References 

Populated places in Bandar Abbas County